Sudhir Kumar Jain, referred to as Sudhir K. Jain (born 1959) is the incumbent and 28th Vice-Chancellor of Banaras Hindu University. He is a civil engineer by education and has formerly served three terms as the founding director of the Indian Institute of Technology Gandhinagar. He has carried out intensive research and development in the fields of seismic design codes, dynamic of buildings, and post-earthquake studies. Beside these, Jain has actively participated in teaching, research activities and development in earthquake engineering focused on developing countries. He is an elected fellow of Indian National Academy of Engineering. He was also elected a member of U.S. National Academy of Engineering (2021) for leadership in earthquake engineering in developing countries. 

He has served as the president of International Association of Earthquake Engineering (IAEE) from 2014 to 2018. He also served on the engineering and computer science jury for the Infosys Prize from 2019.

Education
Jain earned Bachelor of Civil Engineering from the University of Roorkee (now IIT Roorkee) in 1979, and masters, and doctoral degrees from the California Institute of Technology, Pasadena in 1980 and 1983 respectively.

Awards and honors
Thomson Memorial Gold Medal (1979)
Robert A Millikan Fellowship (1982)
Padma Shri for Science & Engineering (8 November 2021)
California Institute of Technology Distinguished Alumni Award (2022)
IIT Roorkee Distinguished Alumnus Award-2018

Selected bibliography

Books
Earthquake rebuilding in Gujarat, India: an EERI recovery reconnaissance report 
Engineering Response to Hazards of Terrorism

Articles
Earthquake safety in India: achievements, challenges and opportunities 
Simplified seismic analysis of soil–well–pier system for bridges 
Code Approaches to Seismic Design of Masonry-Infilled Reinforced Concrete Frames: A State-of-the-Art Review 
Analysis of earth dams affected by the 2001 Bhuj Earthquake 
Seismic torsional vibration in elevated tanks

See also 

 Banaras Hindu University
 IIT Gandhinagar
 IIT Kanpur
 Vice-Chancellor of Banaras Hindu University

References

Living people
1959 births
Vice Chancellors of Banaras Hindu University
Banaras Hindu University people
IIT Roorkee alumni
California Institute of Technology alumni
Indian civil engineers
20th-century Indian engineers
Indian Institute of Technology directors
Recipients of the Padma Shri in science & engineering